The Moa Plate was an ancient oceanic plate that formed in the Early Cretaceous south of the Pacific–Phoenix Ridge. The Moa Plate was obliquely subducted beneath the Gondwana margin, and material accreted from it is now part of the Eastern Province of New Zealand. The plate was named in 2001 by Rupert Sutherland and Chris Hollis.

References

Tectonic plates
Historical tectonic plates
Historical geology
Mesozoic geology
Geology of New Zealand